Hayley Soraya Tamaddon (born 24 January 1977) is a British actress. She is known for her roles in the ITV soap operas as Del Dingle in Emmerdale and Andrea Beckett in Coronation Street.

Tamaddon won the fifth series of Dancing on Ice on 28 March 2010, with skating partner Daniel Whiston. She returned with Whiston for the ninth series in 2014, which saw many of the previous winners and favourites from the show compete.

Background
Tamaddon was born to an Iranian father and English mother. She attended Montgomery High School in Blackpool. She trained in dance at Phil Winston's Theatreworks and Laine Theatre Arts.

Career

Stage
Tamaddon has appeared in a number of theatre roles including Frenchie in Grease and Diana Morales in A Chorus Line. She has also appeared in Boogie Nights opposite actor/comedian Kev Orkian, Mamma Mia! and Fame as well as playing Janet in the 2007 United Kingdom tour of The Rocky Horror Show. Tamaddon has shared the role of the Lady of the Lake with Jodie Prenger and Amy Nuttall in the UK Tour of Spamalot.

Tamaddon has also appeared in pantomimes including Aladdin and Snow White. In December 2007, she played the Fairy godmother in Cinderella at the Lyceum Theatre in Sheffield, and in 2008 performed the title role in Cinderella at the Alhambra Theatre in Bradford. She returned to the Lyceum Theatre in the production of Peter Pan, opposite Nigel Planer's Captain Hook.
Tamaddon also played Sleeping Beauty in Sleeping Beauty from 14 December 2011 to 15 January 2012 at the Theatre Royal in Norwich. In 2016 she embarked on a UK national tour of Chicago, starring as Roxie Hart.  From March 2018, she will star as Millie Dillmount in the UK Tour of Thoroughly Modern Millie. Tamaddon also played the role of Miss Hedge in the West End musical Everybody's Talking About Jamie for a limited run in 2019.

Television
Tamaddon played Delilah Dingle in soap opera Emmerdale  from 2005 to 2007. Her first episode was aired on 15 July 2005.

Tamaddon was written out of Emmerdale in the summer of 2007 when series producer, Kathleen Beedles decided not to renew her contract but promised not to kill off the character of Delilah Dingle – leaving the door open for a possible return at some point in the future. Tamaddon has also appeared in The Royal, Where The Heart Is, Ghosthunting with the Dingles, as Lulu on Celebrity Stars in Their Eyes, Loose Women and This Morning.

In March 2007, Tamaddon appeared on Soapstar Superchef. She and her team-mate Mathew Bose, who co-stars with her as Paul Lambert, in Emmerdale, were crowned winners of the show on 13 April. She has also played the role of a nurse in The Royal Today.

Tamaddon appeared on week 18 of the BBC children's television show, Hider in the House on 4 May 2008, which was filmed at a family household in Wortley, West Yorkshire. She was busted on challenge seven but said "Personally I think I have been one of the best hiders ever and it's been really good fun."

Tamaddon appeared in Channel 4's Shameless as Calista, a lesbian who has a one-night stand with Karen Maguire. She also appeared in Waterloo Road as Zoe.

Tamaddon was crowned champion of the fifth series of Dancing on Ice, where she skated with professional skater and childhood friend Daniel Whiston. Competing over 12 weeks in front of 10 million viewers, including their Jai Ho routine, she reached the final against Hollyoaks actor Kieron Richardson who came third, and Gary Lucy with whom she went head-to head in the Bolero. Tamaddon won the trophy with over 80% of the public vote and went on tour with Torvill and Dean.

On 25 September 2010, Tamaddon appeared on an episode of All Star Family Fortunes.

In October 2013, it was announced that Tamaddon would be joining Coronation Street as Andrea Beckett, a friend of Steve McDonald (Simon Gregson) and rival of Michelle Connor (Kym Marsh). She made her first appearance on 23 December 2013. Tamaddon and her character exited the soap opera in September 2015 alongside co-star Craig Charles who played Andrea's boyfriend Lloyd Mullaney.

Soapstar Superstar

Tamaddon was runner-up in ITV's Soapstar Superstar which led to her singing with Michael Ball at the Opera House in Blackpool in March 2007 during his tour. For finishing second she raised £25,000 for Brian House Children's Hospice in Bispham.

Show 1 – "River Deep Mountain High" (Tina Turner)
Show 2 – "Knock on Wood" (Amii Stewart)
Show 3 – "There You'll Be" (Faith Hill)
Show 4 – "It Must Have Been Love" (Roxette)
Show 5 – "Jump" (Girls Aloud)
Show 6 – 1. "When I Fall in Love" (Nat King Cole)
 – 2. Beverley Knight medley: "Shoulda Woulda Coulda", "Keep This Fire Burning", "Greatest Day"
Show 7 – 1. "On My Own" (from Les Misérables)
 – 2. "Son of a Preacher Man" (Dusty Springfield)
Show 8: 1. "Disco Inferno" (The Trammps)
 – 2. "Chains" (Tina Arena)
 – 3. "Together Again" (Janet Jackson)
Show 9 – 1. "Jump" (Girls Aloud)
 – 2. "Feels Like I'm in Love" (Kelly Marie)

Radio
Tamaddon has appeared on 96.3 Radio Aire in Leeds. Her first appearance was on the breakfast show in October 2009, when she presented with presenter Paul 'Griffo' Griffiths, who was covering for JK and Joel. She then spent a further week on the show, and in November once again covered with Griffo.

Film
Tamaddon appeared in a short film in June 2008 promoting road safety to young people in Cheshire. The film was made in conjunction with the Cheshire Constabulary and the Cheshire Safer Roads Partnership.

It was announced in May 2017 Tamaddon would appear in comedy feature Eaten by Lions alongside Antonio Aakeel and Jack Carroll, directed by Jason Wingard.

Filmography

Television

Theatre credits

Personal life
Tamaddon was engaged to Darren Charles, a dancer and choreographer from Grimsby but called off the wedding after he admitted having cheated on her whilst she was filming Dancing on Ice. In the press, she later ruled out any possibility of a reconciliation. She was in a relationship with comedian Marcus Brigstocke, with whom she had worked on Spamalot in 2010, leading to his divorce from his wife Sophie.

In June 2014, Tamaddon was admitted to hospital after the pressure of working on Coronation Street and the Dancing on Ice tour became too much for her.

On 22 April 2019, Tamaddon announced on Twitter that she was pregnant, posted a picture of her baby bump and said: "I'm so pleased to tell you all... I'm expecting my first child with my wonderful boyfriend Adrian!!" Three weeks later she announced that the couple were also engaged. She gave birth to a son on 12 October 2019.

On Mother's Day, 27 March 2022, Hayley announced that she and Adrian had split in a post on Twitter. She wrote, "This Mother’s Day is very different for me as I am now a single mum. Mine and Jasper's life has been turned upside down over the last few months.. but I realise the best thing to come out of all of this is Jasper".

References

External links

 
 Hayley Tamaddon Official Website

1977 births
Living people
British actresses of Asian descent
English television actresses
English musical theatre actresses
English stage actresses
English soap opera actresses
English female dancers
English people of Iranian descent
People from Bispham, Blackpool